"Secret Love" (Korean: 비밀연애) is a song recorded by South Korean idol group B.A.P. It is released as a Digital single on March 3, 2012, through TS Entertainment. The song was released as a promotional single for their mini-album, Warrior EP. The song was written by Bang Yong Guk and Kang Jiwon; and features vocals from Song Jieun. The music video for "Secret Love" contained behind the scenes footage of B.A.P's "Warrior" and Bang&Zelo's "Never Give Up", and it served as a tribute video for their fans.

Background and release 
After B.A.P ended the promotion for "Warrior", TS Entertainment announced that they will have follow-up promotional single in March with "Secret Love". The song features label mate Song Jieun of Secret. On February 27, TS Entertainment revealed, “Following B.A.P's performance of Warrior on the February 26 episode of SBS’ Inkigayo, the members will begin promotions for Secret Love later this week and shed their tough masculine image to display a new side to them.” The agency added, “We contemplated quite a lot on which track we should follow up to Warrior off B.A.P's debut album and since we wanted to show a new side of the group we decided on Secret Love.”

The song served only as a promotional single with its music video being filmed with behind the scenes footage of "Warrior" and "Never Give Up". It also serves as a tribute video to their fans.

Composition and theme 

"Secret Love" is a promotional single from B.A.P's first mini-album, Warrior (EP). "Secret Love" is a R&B, Hip-Hop song with influences from Latin. The song runs for 3:27 (3 minutes, 27 seconds). It was written by Bang Yong Guk and Kang Jiwon; and produced by Kang Jiwon and LOPTOMIST. The song features the vocals of label mate Song Jieun of Secret, taking the lyrics of the female part. The song lyrically tells the sad love story from the perspective of a celebrity and how they have to hold secret relationships.

Critical reception 
iTunes wrote, "Short for Best Absolute Perfect, BAP is a Korean boy band, and Warrior is its debut EP[....]The real standout here is "Secret Love," where the beats mellow out enough to actually hear the members rapping. It's set to boom-baps, chill acoustic guitar strumming, and smooth singing from Secret's Song Ji Eun."

Promotions

Chart performance 
"Secret Love" peaked at number 132 on the Gaon Charts during March 10, 2012. It fared well on the Gaon Online BGM chart, entering at the top 20 while peaking at number 17. The song also charted on the Gaon Mobile Chart at number 81.

Live performances 
"Secret Love" was first performed on B.A.P's debut showcase in Seoul on January 28, 2012. On Korean music shows, B.A.P first performed "Secret Love" on M! Countdown, on March 1, 2012. The group also performed "Secret Love" on Music Bank on March 2. They also performed the song on Music Core, MTV's The Show, Inkigayo and Music on Top.

Music video

Background 
As a gift to their fans, TS Entertainment issued a music video for “Secret Love” on March 1, 2012. The video contains various behind the scenes footage from photo shoots, live performances, and their music video recording, such as in "Warrior", Bang&Zelo's "Never Give Up" and footage from their debut showcase on January 28, 2012.

Ta-Dah It's B.A.P cut version 
B.A.P's new reality program titled ‘Ta-Da, It's B.A.P‘ aired its 8th episode on February 26, where they revealed the making of their music video for “Secret Love”. In the music video, member Him Chan displayed his acting skills by taking the role of a man who's unable to express his love to a girl. However the music video never came in fruition as it was only intended for the show. TS Entertainment released a different music video for the song and it served as a tribute video for their fans.

Track listing
Korean single

Credits and personnel 
These credits were adapted from the Warrior (EP) liner notes.

Bang Yong Guk - vocals, rap, songwriting
Choi Jun Hong (Zelo) - vocals, rap
Jung Dae Hyun - vocals
Yoo Young Jae - vocals
Kim Him Chan - vocals
Moon Jong Up - vocals
Kang Jiwon - producer, songwriting, music
Loptomist - producer, music

Charts

Release history

References

External links
 

B.A.P (South Korean band) songs
2012 songs
Korean-language songs